Marcela Paz Vacarezza Etcheverry (born 8 May 1970 in Antofagasta) is a Chilean television presenter and psychologist. She is the wife of TV presenter Rafael Araneda with whom she has three children, Martina, Florencia and Vicente.

Marcela is daughter of hematologist Ricardo Vacarezza Yávar, and the younger sister of actress Adriana Vacarezza. In 1992, Marcela won Miss Chile pageant contest and in the same year she started her television career. After taking a maternity leave, she returned on TV as hostess for En Portada until 2005. Currently, Marcela is part of the television show .

TV shows
 Coctel 1992–1994
 La Ola (La Red) 1994–1998
 Enemigas (CHV) 2000–2003
 En Portada (La Red) 2004–2006
 Gente Como Tú (CHV) 2006–2008
  (CHV) 2009–2011

References

1970 births
Chilean beauty pageant winners
Chilean people of Italian descent
Chilean people of Basque descent
Chilean psychologists
Chilean television presenters
Chilean women journalists
Living people
Miss Universe 1992 contestants
Miss Universo Chile winners
People from Antofagasta
Chilean women psychologists
Chilean women television presenters
Chilean television personalities